The 2002 OFC Nations Cup Final was a football match that took place on 14 July 2002 at the Ericsson Stadium in Auckland, New Zealand to determine the 2002 OFC Nations Cup champion. New Zealand defeated Australia 1–0, with the only goal being scored by central defender Ryan Nelsen in the 78th minute. The match was the third final between the two countries, an OFC Nations Cup record, after their 1998 and 2000 matches. With the win, New Zealand qualified for the 2003 FIFA Confederations Cup, and the AFC – OFC Challenge Cup.

Match

Details

See also
 Australia–New Zealand soccer rivalry

References

Final
2002
2002
2002
2002 in Australian soccer
2002 in New Zealand association football
July 2002 sports events in New Zealand